The 2017–18 Morehead State Eagles men's basketball team represented Morehead State University during the 2017–18 NCAA Division I men's basketball season. The Eagles, led by first-year head coach Preston Spradlin, played their home games at Ellis Johnson Arena in Morehead, Kentucky as members of the Ohio Valley Conference. They finished the season 8–21, 4–14 in OVC play to finish in last place. They failed to qualify for the OVC tournament.

Previous season 
The Eagles finished the 2016–17 season 14–16, 10–6 in OVC play to finish in second place in the East Division. In the OVC tournament they lost to Murray State in the quarterfinals.

On November 22, 2016, Morehead State suspended head coach Sean Woods with pay while the school investigated complaints made against Woods. Assistant coach Preston Spradlin was named interim head coach. On December 15, two days after Woods was charged with misdemeanor battery in Indiana for allegedly assaulting two of his players during a game versus Evansville, it was announced that Woods had resigned. It was announced that Spradlin would continue as interim coach while the school conducted a nationwide search for a replacement. On March 16, 2017, Spradlin was named full-time head coach.

Preseason 
In a vote of conference coaches and sports information directors, Morehead State was picked to finish in 9th place in the OVC.

After five years of divisional play in the OVC, the conference eliminated divisions for the 2017–18 season. Additionally, for the first time, each conference team will play 18 conference games.

Roster

Schedule and results

|-
!colspan=9 style=| Exhibition

|-
!colspan=9 style=| Non-conference regular season

|-
!colspan=9 style=| Ohio Valley Conference regular season

Source

References

Morehead State Eagles men's basketball seasons
Morehead State
Morehead State
Morehead State